Tara Bhattacharjee (28 August 1915 – 5 August 1984) was an Indian cricketer. He played five first-class matches for Bengal between 1938 and 1941.

See also
 List of Bengal cricketers

References

External links
 

1915 births
1984 deaths
Indian cricketers
Bengal cricketers
Cricketers from Kolkata